Uiwang Station (Station P152) is a ground-level metro station on line 1 of the Seoul Subway in Uiwang, South Korea.  The station's four exits offer access to the Korea National University of Transportation, the Korean Railroad Museum and the Bugok Dong area of Uiwang. Travel time from Uiwang Station to Seoul Station on Line 1 is 50 minutes.

Disambiguation
"Uiwang Station" is also the former name of what is now known as Obong Station. The two are separate entities.

History
Uiwang Station opened on May 1, 1944, under the name of Bugok Station (부곡역/富谷驛), a name taken from the "dong" in which it is located.  Trains on the Seoul Subway began calling at the station on August 15, 1974.  The current station building was completed on February 17, 2002.  On June 25, 2004, the station changed its name to Uiwang and almost three years later, on February 20, 2007, the hanja name changed from 儀旺驛 to 義王驛.

Services
The first train of the day on weekdays (not including national holidays) is at 5.22 a.m. northbound and 5.29 a.m. southbound, while the last is at 12.01 a.m. northbound and 12.14 a.m. southbound. Northbound trains have various destinations.

References

Seoul Metropolitan Subway stations
Metro stations in Uiwang
Railway stations opened in 1944